Josephine Goube is a French entrepreneur. She is a refugee advocate serving as founder and CEO of Sistech.

Education
Josephine Goube studied  Economics & Political sciences, Finance & Social sciences at Paris Institute of Political Studies in 2006–2010. In 2009–2011, she studied Urbanization & Development at the London School of Economics and Political Science.

Career
Josephine Goube began her career in tech & social startup incubator projects in London. In 2014, she co-founded Girls In tech London. In 2016, she became a member of Founders of the Future and CEO of Techfugees, a non-profit organisation bringing tech communities together to alleviate the suffering of refugees. From 2018, she gradually increased her engagement supporting refugee women with fellowship programmes under the #TF4Women Techfugees brand. Starting 2021, the programmes scaled to two new countries (Greece & Italy) serving four times more women. In 2022, Josephine Goube decided to spin-off the initiative under a totally new brand name and officially cut off links with Techfugees.

Josephine Goube sits on the board of the Norwegian Refugee Council since 2018, is a Schmidt Futures Fellow since 2022 and acted as an expert for the European Commission on migration reforms related to the Blue Card from 2015 until early 2020.

Three times in a row on the Forbes 30 under 30 list, she became known in the UK as one of Marie Claire UK's "Women at the Top" for her work as a Migration Campaigner in 2015.  and named as one of "35 Women Under 35" to watch by Management Today.

Awards
2016 - 30 Under 30 - All Star Alumni Forbes.

2016 - 30 Under 30 - Social Entrepreneurs (Forbes)

2017 - Prix Margaret (La journee de la femme digitale).

2017 - 30 Under 30 - Europe - All Star Alumni (Forbes)

2018 - 30 Under 30 - Europe - All Star Alumni (Forbes)

References

External links

Global Shakers: Josephine Goube
Interview with Josephine Goube, CEO at Techfugees – Erevena
Josephine Goube: “Build alongside, not for, refugee beneficiaries”
Josephine Goube: la tech au service des refugies
Josephine Goube: «On n'entreprend pas pour le salaire»
the fullest podcast: Josephine Goube

21st-century French businesswomen
21st-century French businesspeople
Year of birth missing (living people)
Living people
People from Boulogne-sur-Mer